Koch Marshall Trio is a three piece band which formed in 2017 in Wauwatosa, Wisconsin. The band consists of a guitar player, a drummer and a B3 organ player. The guitar player is Greg Koch who grew up in the Milwaukee area of Wisconsin. The drummer in the band is Dylan Koch. The B3 organ player is Toby Lee Marshall, from Minneapolis, Minnesota.

Formation and early history (2017-2018) 
The Koch Marshall Trio formed because of the persistence of drummer Dylan Koch. The band members were all schooled in jazz and blues: the jazz background allows each member to be comfortable with the improvisation which is evident in their live performance.

Greg Koch said the band came together when his son Dylan Koch convinced him to meet Toby Lee Marshall one afternoon. The three musicians got together to play at a local recording studio. The three players all felt like they had a connection.

The Koch Marshall Trio is an instrumental group: Greg Koch established the organ/guitar trio in 2017. The Trio includes Greg Koch's son Dylan Koch on drums, Toby Lee Marshall on B3 organ and Greg Koch on guitar. The Koch Marshall Trio has signed a contract with the Mascot Label Group. They released their debut studio album on February 23, 2018 (Title: Toby Arrives) under the Mascot Label Group

Style and legacy

The Koch Marshall Trio's debut album Toby Arrives contains songs that, "morph into an amazing new relationship with organ influenced Blues Rock."

Discography
 Toby Arrives (Koch Marshall Trio) (2018)
 From the Up'Nuh (Koch Marshall Trio) (2021)

References

External links
Koch Marshall Trio in 2018 
Koch Marshall Trio in 2018 (Unrepentant)

American musical trios
Musical groups established in 2017
Rock music groups from Wisconsin
2017 establishments in Wisconsin